Lunar Eclipse is the second solo album by David Bryan from the band Bon Jovi.  Featuring all the songs from his first album "On a Full Moon", released in 1995, except for "Awakening" and "Midnight Voodoo". Instead of those two tracks it features two brand new tracks, "Second Chance" and "I Can Love".

Track listing

References

2000 albums
David Bryan albums